Birla Institute of Liberal Arts and Management Sciences (BILAMS, Kolkata) established in 1987, is an autonomous non-profit educational society a division of the Birla Educational Institution registered under the West Bengal Societies Registration Act 1961, with a strong commitment to the growth and development of a liberal education.

Academics
BILAMS is accredited by the West Bengal State Council of Technical Education. Courses are offered in Public Relations, Fashion Design, Mass Communication, Montessori Education, Interior Decoration and Design, Personnel Management, Human Resource Development, Marketing Management, Advertising Management, Travel and Tourism Management, and Textile Design. Call Centre and Medical Transcription Programs are also carried out. Apart from normal curriculum, the institution also encourages cultural activities. Projects, seminars and site visits are organized to supplement the learning ability of the students.

Student life

BILAMS feel every educated person should be a bit of an all rounder possessing some knowledge of general cultural heritage, broadly familiar with modes of thinking in other intellectual disciplines and able to find pleasure in simply stretching the mind and imagination.

Notable alumni
 Anuradha Sharma Pujari

References

External links
 

Universities and colleges in Kolkata
Educational institutions established in 1987
1987 establishments in West Bengal